Templenoe is a civil parish in County Kerry, Ireland. It is situated four miles from Kenmare, on the N70 road to Sneem, which forms part of the Ring of Kerry.

Templenoe is the location of the Ring of Kerry golf club. There is a Gaelic Athletic Association ground, a pier, and a Catholic chapel of ease for the Kenmare parish. Dromore Castle, Dunkerron Castle and Dromquinna House are located in the area.

Templenoe GAA is the local Gaelic Athletic Association club. The Gaelic football playing brothers of the County Kerry team, Pat Spillane, Mick Spillane and Tom Spillane, were each born in Templenoe.

In the HBO TV series Boardwalk Empire, Templenoe is the birthplace of fictional character Margaret Schroeder née Rohan.

See also
 List of towns and villages in Ireland

References

Civil parishes of County Kerry